Neoscona theisi is a species of spider in the family Araneidae. Spiders in the genus Neoscona have a mostly pantropical distribution.

Description

They build an orb web and rest near the centre. Individuals vary in color from dark reddish-brown to pale-yellow with a distinct pattern on the upper abdomen, lighter along the centre-line and darker on the sides. The legs are light with dark patches at the joints. The sternum is a dark shield shape with a pale yellow longitudinal stripe mid-line. The sternum contrasts with the pale  coxa of the nearest leg joints.

There is a characteristic longitudinal groove on the carapace which separates all species of Neoscona from species of Araneus.

Gallery

References

theisi
Spiders described in 1841